The Moon Landing World Tour is the fourth concert tour by British recording artist James Blunt. Launched in support of his fourth studio album, Moon Landing (2013), the tour began in January 2014. It continued into 2014 and 2015 with over 150 shows in the Americas, Europe, Australasia, Asia and Africa.

Opening acts
Anna F. 
Shake Shake Go 
Oh Honey 
Busby Marou 
Gavin James 
Josh Record 
Sick Puppies 
Rea Garvey 
Julian Le Play 
Mary Spender 
The Majority Says 
Bogi 
Lacey 
Drew Allen

Setlist

The following setlist was obtained from the 8 June 2014 concert; held at the Plenary Hall in Melbourne, Australia. It does not represent all concerts for the duration of the tour.

"Face the Sun"  
"I'll Take Everything"
"Blue on Blue" 
"High" 	
"Billy"  
"Wisemen"
"Carry You Home"
"Satellites"
"These Are the Words"
"Miss America"
"Postcards"
"Goodbye My Lover"
"I Really Want You"
"Coz I Luv You"
"Heart to Heart"
"Same Mistake"
"You're Beautiful"
"So Long, Jimmy"
Encore
"Bonfire Heart"
"Stay the Night"
"1973"

Tour dates

Festivals and other miscellaneous performances

wRomantic Festival
Forest Live
Adnams Newmarket Night
Epsom Live
Symphony at The Tower
Hop Farm Festival
Sous les Pins
Moon and Stars
Pori Jazz
Luglio Suona Bene
Blue Balls Festival
Thurn-und-Taxis-Schlossfestspiele
Paléo Festival
Festival de Carcassonne
Festival Dranouter
Ronquières Festival
Festival Jardins de Cap Roig
Musik im Park
Foire aux vins d'Alsace
Wickham Festival
Music Live! Racedays
Festivalul Internaţional de Muzică şi Artă Transilvania
Top of the Mountain Concert
Emirates Airline Dubai Jazz Festival

Cancellations and rescheduled shows

Box office score data

External links
James Blunt Official Website

References 

2014 concert tours
2015 concert tours
James Blunt